Morgan Rattler was probably a French vessel launched under another name and taken in prize early in 1793 after the outbreak of the French Revolutionary Wars. She became a Liverpool privateer, but was quickly captured. A few years later she became a French privateer. She captured several British merchantmen before a British naval brig captured her and her prizes.

Career
Morgan Rattler first appeared in Lloyd's Register (LR) in 1793.

Captain William Gibson acquired a letter of marque on 25 May 1793. Morgan Rattler, Gibson, master, was reported in August to have been captured and taken into Lorient.

Morgan Rattler may have served the French Navy in 1794. Between April and July the corvette Morgan was stationed at Bay of Bourgneuf under the command of enseigne de vaisseau non entrenu Collet. She then apparently became a privateer.

On 28 June 1796 HMS Suffisante captured Morgan. Morgan, under the command of John Coffin Whitney, was the former Morgan Rattler.

On 27 August Suffisante intercepted and recaptured two British merchant ships near the Île de Batz. They reported that they had been sailing from Oporto when a privateer of 16 guns and 10 swivel guns had captured them. When last seen the privateer had been north of Scilly in chase of some other merchant vessels. Suffisante immediately sent the recaptured vessels to Plymouth and sailed Suffisante to the French coast between Ushant and the Île de Batz in the hopes of intercepting the privateer on her return, or any prizes that she might have taken on their way to Morlaix or Brest.

The next morning Commander Nicholas Tomlinson, of Suffisante sighted the privateer and four prizes. He was able to capture the privateer by 1pm; Suffisante fired some small-arms fire at and she did not fire back, but instead struck. Tomlinson then put a prize crew on board the privateer, after taking off her captain and officers, and captor and ex-privateer set off after the prizes.Suffisante recaptured not only the four prizes she had seen, but two others as well. The six merchant vessels were:

 Draper, 200 tons (bm), of Dublin, sailing from Oporto to Dublin, carrying 400 pipes of wire and 11 bales of cotton (Drapers  master was Maddock, or Maddox);
 Brothers, 180 tons (bm), of Liverpool, sailing from Oporto to Liverpool, carrying 350 pipes and 30 hogsheads of wine and 72 bales of cotton;
 Mary Ann, 70 tons (bm), of Dublin, sailing from Oporto to Dublin, carrying 272 pipes of wine, 11 bales of cotton, and five casks of vinegar;
 Ann, 170 tons (bm), of Dublin, sailing from Oporto to Dublin, carrying 303 pipes of wine, 15 boxes and 10 baskets of lemons;
 Vine, 110 tons (bm), of Lancaster, sailing from Oporto to Lancaster, carrying 108 pipes and four hogsheads of wine, 175 bags cotton, and three-and-a-half tons of cork, lemons, etc.; and 
 Eliza'', 160 tons (bm), of Dublin, sailing from London to Dublin, carrying 250 chests of tea, 250 barrels of porter, a quantity of steel, and other dry goods.

At the time these captures were considered highly important. The Committee for Encouraging the Capture of French Privateers etc. and the Court of Directors of the Royal Exchange Assurance, each voted Tomlinson a piece of plate valued at 50 guineas.

Notes

Citations

References
 
 
 
 

Ships built in France
Captured ships
Privateer ships of Great Britain
Corvettes of the French Navy
Privateer ships of France